Glutamic acid (symbol Glu or E; the ionic form is known as glutamate) is an α-amino acid that is used by almost all living beings in the biosynthesis of proteins. It is a non-essential nutrient for humans, meaning that the human body can synthesize enough for its use. It is also the most abundant excitatory neurotransmitter in the vertebrate nervous system. It serves as the precursor for the synthesis of the inhibitory gamma-aminobutyric acid (GABA) in GABA-ergic neurons.

Glutamic acid exists in three optically isomeric forms; the dextrorotatory -form is usually obtained by hydrolysis of gluten or from the waste waters of beet-sugar manufacture or by fermentation. Its molecular structure could be idealized as HOOC−CH()−()2−COOH, with two carboxyl groups −COOH and one amino group −. However, in the solid state and mildly acidic water solutions, the molecule assumes an electrically neutral zwitterion structure −OOC−CH()−()2−COOH. It is encoded by the codons GAA or GAG.

The acid can lose one proton from its second carboxyl group to form the conjugate base, the singly-negative anion glutamate −OOC−CH()−()2−COO−. This form of the compound is prevalent in neutral solutions. The glutamate neurotransmitter plays the principal role in neural activation. This anion creates the savory umami flavor of foods and is found in glutamate flavorings such as MSG. In Europe it is classified as food additive E620. In highly alkaline solutions the doubly negative anion −OOC−CH()−()2−COO− prevails. The radical corresponding to glutamate is called glutamyl.

Chemistry

Ionization

When glutamic acid is dissolved in water, the amino group (−) may gain a proton, and/or the carboxyl groups may lose protons, depending on the acidity of the medium.

In sufficiently acidic environments, the amino group gains a proton and the molecule becomes a cation with a single positive charge, HOOC−CH()−()2−COOH.

At pH values between about 2.5 and 4.1, the carboxylic acid closer to the amine generally loses a proton, and the acid becomes the neutral zwitterion −OOC−CH()−()2−COOH. This is also the form of the compound in the crystalline solid state.  The change in protonation state is gradual; the two forms are in equal concentrations at pH 2.10.

At even higher pH, the other carboxylic acid group loses its proton and the acid exists almost entirely as the glutamate anion −OOC−CH()−()2−COO−, with a single negative charge overall. The change in protonation state occurs at pH 4.07. This form with both carboxylates lacking protons is dominant in the physiological pH range (7.35–7.45).

At even higher pH, the amino group loses the extra proton, and the prevalent species is the doubly-negative anion −OOC−CH()−()2−COO−. The change in protonation state occurs at pH 9.47.

Optical isomerism
Glutamic acid is chiral; two mirror-image enantiomers exist: (−), and (+). The  form is more widely occurring in nature, but the  form occurs in some special contexts, such as the bacterial capsule and cell walls of the bacteria (which produce it from the  form with the enzyme glutamate racemase) and the liver of mammals.

History

Although they occur naturally in many foods, the flavor contributions made by glutamic acid and other amino acids were only scientifically identified early in the 20th century. The substance was discovered and identified in the year 1866 by the German chemist Karl Heinrich Ritthausen, who treated wheat gluten (for which it was named) with sulfuric acid. In 1908, Japanese researcher Kikunae Ikeda of the Tokyo Imperial University identified brown crystals left behind after the evaporation of a large amount of kombu broth as glutamic acid. These crystals, when tasted, reproduced the ineffable but undeniable flavor he detected in many foods, most especially in seaweed. Professor Ikeda termed this flavor umami. He then patented a method of mass-producing a crystalline salt of glutamic acid, monosodium glutamate.

Synthesis

Biosynthesis

Industrial synthesis
Glutamic acid is produced on the largest scale of any amino acid, with an estimated annual production of about 1.5 million tons in 2006. Chemical synthesis was supplanted by the aerobic fermentation of sugars and ammonia in the 1950s, with the organism Corynebacterium glutamicum (also known as Brevibacterium flavum) being the most widely used for production. Isolation and purification can be achieved by concentration and crystallization; it is also widely available as its hydrochloride salt.

Function and uses

Metabolism 
Glutamate is a key compound in cellular metabolism. In humans, dietary proteins are broken down by digestion into amino acids, which serve as metabolic fuel for other functional roles in the body. A key process in amino acid degradation is transamination, in which the amino group of an amino acid is transferred to an α-ketoacid, typically catalysed by a transaminase. The reaction can be generalised as such:

 R1-amino acid + R2-α-ketoacid ⇌ R1-α-ketoacid + R2-amino acid

A very common α-keto acid is α-ketoglutarate, an intermediate in the citric acid cycle. Transamination of α-ketoglutarate gives glutamate. The resulting α-ketoacid product is often a useful one as well, which can contribute as fuel or as a substrate for further metabolism processes. Examples are as follows:

 Alanine + α-ketoglutarate ⇌ pyruvate + glutamate

 Aspartate + α-ketoglutarate ⇌ oxaloacetate + glutamate

Both pyruvate and oxaloacetate are key components of cellular metabolism, contributing as substrates or intermediates in fundamental processes such as glycolysis, gluconeogenesis, and the citric acid cycle.

Glutamate also plays an important role in the body's disposal of excess or waste nitrogen. Glutamate undergoes deamination, an oxidative reaction catalysed by glutamate dehydrogenase, as follows:

 glutamate + H2O + NADP+ → α-ketoglutarate + NADPH + NH3 + H+

Ammonia (as ammonium) is then excreted predominantly as urea, synthesised in the liver. Transamination can thus be linked to deamination, effectively allowing nitrogen from the amine groups of amino acids to be removed, via glutamate as an intermediate, and finally excreted from the body in the form of urea.

Glutamate is also a neurotransmitter (see below), which makes it one of the most abundant molecules in the brain. Malignant brain tumors known as glioma or glioblastoma exploit this phenomenon by using glutamate as an energy source, especially when these tumors become more dependent on glutamate due to mutations in the gene IDH1.

Neurotransmitter 

Glutamate is the most abundant excitatory neurotransmitter in the vertebrate nervous system. At chemical synapses, glutamate is stored in vesicles. Nerve impulses trigger the release of glutamate from the presynaptic cell. Glutamate acts on ionotropic and metabotropic (G-protein coupled) receptors.  In the opposing postsynaptic cell, glutamate receptors, such as the NMDA receptor or the AMPA receptor, bind glutamate and are activated. Because of its role in synaptic plasticity, glutamate is involved in cognitive functions such as  learning and memory in the brain.  The form of plasticity known as long-term potentiation takes place at glutamatergic synapses in the hippocampus, neocortex, and other parts of the brain. Glutamate works not only as a point-to-point transmitter, but also through spill-over synaptic crosstalk between synapses in which summation of glutamate released from a neighboring synapse creates extrasynaptic signaling/volume transmission.  In addition, glutamate plays important roles in the regulation of growth cones and synaptogenesis during brain development as originally described by Mark Mattson.

Brain nonsynaptic glutamatergic signaling circuits 
Extracellular glutamate in Drosophila brains has been found to regulate postsynaptic glutamate receptor clustering, via a process involving receptor desensitization. A gene expressed in glial cells actively transports glutamate into the extracellular space, while, in the nucleus accumbens-stimulating group II metabotropic glutamate receptors, this gene was found to reduce extracellular glutamate levels. This raises the possibility that this extracellular glutamate plays an "endocrine-like" role as part of a larger homeostatic system.

GABA precursor 
Glutamate also serves as the precursor for the synthesis of the inhibitory gamma-aminobutyric acid (GABA) in GABA-ergic neurons. This reaction is catalyzed by glutamate decarboxylase (GAD), which is most abundant in the cerebellum and pancreas.

Stiff person syndrome is a neurologic disorder caused by anti-GAD antibodies, leading to a decrease in GABA synthesis and, therefore, impaired motor function such as muscle stiffness and spasm. Since the pancreas has abundant GAD, a direct immunological destruction occurs in the pancreas and the patients will have diabetes mellitus.

Flavor enhancer 

Glutamic acid, being a constituent of protein, is present in foods that contain protein, but it can only be tasted when it is present in an unbound form.  Significant amounts of free glutamic acid are present in a wide variety of foods, including cheeses and soy sauce, and glutamic acid is responsible for umami, one of the five basic tastes of the human sense of taste. Glutamic acid often is used as a food additive and flavor enhancer in the form of its sodium salt, known as monosodium glutamate (MSG).

Nutrient 
All meats, poultry, fish, eggs, dairy products, and kombu are excellent sources of glutamic acid. Some protein-rich plant foods also serve as sources.  30% to 35% of gluten (much of the protein in wheat) is glutamic acid. Ninety-five percent of the dietary glutamate is metabolized by intestinal cells in a first pass.

Plant growth 
Auxigro is a plant growth preparation that contains 30% glutamic acid.

NMR spectroscopy 
In recent years, there has been much research into the use of residual dipolar coupling (RDC) in nuclear magnetic resonance spectroscopy (NMR). A glutamic acid derivative, poly-γ-benzyl-L-glutamate (PBLG), is often used as an alignment medium to control the scale of the dipolar interactions observed.

Pharmacology 
The drug phencyclidine (more commonly known as PCP or 'Angel Dust') antagonizes glutamic acid non-competitively at the NMDA receptor. For the same reasons, dextromethorphan and ketamine also have strong dissociative and hallucinogenic effects. Acute infusion of the drug eglumetad (also known as eglumegad or LY354740), an agonist of the metabotropic glutamate receptors 2 and 3) resulted in a marked diminution of yohimbine-induced stress response in bonnet macaques (Macaca radiata); chronic oral administration of eglumetad in those animals led to markedly reduced baseline cortisol levels (approximately 50 percent) in comparison to untreated control subjects.  eglumetad has also been demonstrated to act on the metabotropic glutamate receptor 3 (GRM3) of human adrenocortical cells, downregulating aldosterone synthase, CYP11B1, and the production of adrenal steroids (i.e. aldosterone and cortisol). Glutamate does not easily pass the blood brain barrier, but, instead, is transported by a high-affinity transport system. It can also be converted into glutamine.

See also

References

Further reading

External links

 Glutamic acid MS Spectrum

Amino acids
Proteinogenic amino acids
Glucogenic amino acids
Acidic amino acids
Dicarboxylic acids
Excitatory amino acids
Flavor enhancers
Umami enhancers
Glutamates
Excitatory amino acid receptor agonists
Glycine receptor agonists
Peripherally selective drugs
Chelating agents
Glutamate (neurotransmitter)
E-number additives